Stanley Tiger Romanek (born December 1, 1962) is an American author, con-artist and convicted sex offender.

He was the subject of the documentary film Extraordinary: The Stan Romanek Story. His claims include: being abducted by aliens; being implanted with an alien artifact; having sustained mysterious injuries inflicted by aliens; having experienced telepathic communications with aliens; being dressed in women's clothing by aliens and to have fathered human-alien hybrid offspring. Romanek has been unable to corroborate any of his alien-related claims.

On August 8, 2017, Romanek was found guilty of felony possession of child pornography. On December 14, 2017, he was sentenced to serve two years in a community corrections facility. He is now a registered sex offender in the level 3 program for severe deniers. He is unable to use unmonitored computers or contact children under 18, without special approval. Romanek was resentenced on November 30, 2020, to 10 years of sex offender intensive supervised probation for violating the terms of his original sentence.

Background
Romanek claims to be an alien abductee. He says his first UFO encounter occurred in 2000, and that he has had many experiences with aliens since that time. These include allegedly discovering mysterious wounds on his body which glowed under a black light and claiming to having communication with aliens over a ghost box. He also claims aliens followed his car and visited his home, and that he experienced telepathic communication with them. In one account from 2003, he claims he woke up and found himself wearing a ladies' flannel nightgown and suspected he had been abducted and returned in woman's clothing. Romanek says he eventually came to suspect that the clothing belonged to another supposed abductee, Betty Hill. When asked if the gown had been tested for Hill's DNA, Romanek claimed that it had not because the test was too expensive.
Appearing on ABC Primetime in 2009, Romanek made the unsubstantiated claims that he underwent hypnosis by R. Leo Sprinkle, a psychologist who specializes in alien abduction cases. Romanek claims that under hypnosis he wrote out the Drake equation, which is a formula used to estimate the number of communicative extraterrestrial civilizations in our galaxy, and then added "x100" to it. Joe Nickell, from the Center for Inquiry, suggested the equation was done through simple memorization.

Controversies

Boo Video
In 2008, Romanek appeared on Larry King Live, along with Jeff Peckman, former  Mayoral candidate, endorsing Romanek's story as part of his campaign for a Denver Extraterrestrial Affairs Commission. Romanek claimed to have recorded a video of an alien peeking in his window. This is now commonly referred to as the "Boo Video".

In May 2008, during an interview on Coast To Coast AM radio of Romanek, host George Noory suggested that Romanek take a lie detector test over the authenticity of the "Boo Video". Romanek agreed to this test. When it was conducted later that year, he failed on the question, "Is the Boo tape a hoax?" He alleged without evidence that he had medical conditions that prevent a lie detector test from working on him. Later at the 2009 Mysteries of the Universe conference in Kansas City, Romanek instead alleged, without evidence, that he was set up by Noory to fail.

Romanek made an unverified claim that he consulted a video expert, stating without evidence, that the Boo Video would have cost $50,000 to fake. A  paranormal claims investigations group, Rocky Mountain Paranormal Research Society, debunked this claim, saying that they reproduced the video for about $90.

Missing implant
In 2009, in an interview on ABC Primetime, Romanek said he had physical evidence of his abduction experiences by way of an alien implant in his leg. When a medical test for the implant was requested, Romanek said it had disappeared.

Child pornography
On February 13, 2014, Romanek was arrested after turning himself in at the Larimer County Jail on charges of possessing and distributing child pornography, the outcome of an eight-month investigation launched by the U.S. Department of Homeland Security. More than 300 images as well as video files depicting child pornography were found on Romanek's computers. After appearing at the Larimer County Courthouse, Romanek was released on a $20,000 personal recognizance bond. In March 2016, Romanek pleaded not guilty to both charges after refusing a plea deal from the 8th Judicial DA's Office.

On August 8, 2017, Romanek was found guilty of felony possession of child pornography but not guilty of distribution of child pornography. His sentencing was held December 14, 2017, where he was sentenced to serve two years in the Larimer County Community Corrections halfway house and to register as a sex offender. He reported immediately to jail to wait for space to become available at that facility. As a sex offender, he is now subject to 10 years of intensive supervised probation, not allowed to use computers or electronic devices unmonitored, and not allowed contact with children, under age 18, without approval from the community corrections program.

In February 2014, Romanek's wife Lisa said "We will be taking UFOlogy into the courtroom." After the trial, their defense attorneys, Colorado law firm McClintock and McClintock, stated that they did not do this because it was not relevant to the case. They advised Romanek to appeal the conviction and hire new defense counsel to handle the appeal case, which, according to Romanek's attorneys, is standard advice. Following the announcement of the verdict, Lisa Romanek said that they planned to file a notice of appeal within a 45-day period.

Romanek made public allegations that the government had planted the evidence on his computer. At the sentencing hearing, Deputy District Attorney Joshua Ritter accused him of deception "to try to place blame on others" and "doctoring evidence" in the form of videos falsely alleging that his computer had been hacked. Ritter disclosed that Romanek had even tried to frame his stepson Jacob Shadduck for placing the pornography on the computer; the prosecutor pointed out that even the defense team would not allow such fabricated evidence into court. In 2017, Romanek's attorney Ted McClintock stated that his client plans to appeal the conviction. To date, no appeal has been filed. The implementation of Romanek's mandatory sex offender program had been delayed several times and dragged out, with him making unverified claims that physical illness was keeping him from completely complying with the court orders.

After claims of illness caused him to miss several court dates during his original sentence, Romanek was resentenced on November 30, 2020, to ten more years of intense supervised probation. The judge expressed concern that Romanek was not taking responsibility for his crimes.

Documentary film
In 2013, J3FILMS produced the documentary Extraordinary: The Stan Romanek Story (105 minutes).

See also
Grey alien

References

External links
 Facebook site: Stan Romanek-Author
 Facebook site: Extraordinary: The Stan Romanek Story

1962 births
Living people
American people convicted of child pornography offenses
American UFO writers
Ufologists
Contactees
Writers from Denver
People from Aurora, Colorado